
Gmina Krasne is a rural gmina (administrative district) in Rzeszów County, Subcarpathian Voivodeship, in south-eastern Poland.

Villages
Gmina Krasne contains the villages and settlements of Krasne, Malawa, Palikówka and Strażów.

Neighbouring gminas
Gmina Krasne is bordered by the gminas of Chmielnik, Czarna, Łańcut and Trzebownisko.

References
Polish official population figures 2006

Krasne
Gmina Krasne